The Hawaiian Host Group is a company with its headquarters in Honolulu, Hawaii, United States, which mainly is engaged in manufacturing and sales of sweets and souvenirs.

Overview
Mamoru Takitani, a Sansei American who lived in Maui with his parents, "invented" the chocolate-covered macadamia nut, which became an instant success. He then moved to Honolulu, Oahu, acquired the Ellen Dye Candies confectionery company, and renamed it Hawaiian Host in 1960.

In 2015, Hawaiian Host strengthened its business by acquiring the Mauna Loa Macadamia Nut Corporation on the Big Island of Hawaii. Currently, the Hawaiian Host Group is one of the largest companies that manufacture and sell Hawaiian sweets and souvenirs, such as chocolate-covered and lightly salted macadamia nuts, KOHO chocolate and clothes.

The Group has also set up Mamoru and Aiko Takitani's "Takitani Foundation" to help in the education of young people in Hawaii.

See also 
Tourism in Hawaii

References

External links
Official site

Companies based in Honolulu
Confectionery companies of the United States
Tourism in Hawaii